Gaskin may refer to:

Gaskin (surname)
9K31 Strela-1, a Russian military vehicle tagged with the NATO reporting name 'Gaskin'
Gaskin (horse) - large muscle on the hind leg of a horse or related animal between the stifle and the hock; the relevant section of the leg. Homologous to the human calf

See also
Gaskin v United Kingdom - European legal case